Ashley Bratcher is an actress who has starred in Christian films in the U.S. She portrayed anti-abortion activist Abby Johnson in the 2019 film Unplanned.

Early life
Bratcher was born in North Carolina. She grew up in a mobile home and considers Georgia her home state. Ashley began acting on stage at age 16, and attended Campbell University where she graduated with honors. She briefly worked as a middle school teacher before becoming a full-time actress.

Career
After acting in several short films and minor roles, in 2015 Bratcher starred as the female lead of Christian romance film Princess Cut. She continued to act in several other faith-based films, such as War Room and 90 Minutes in Heaven. In 2018, she was approached for the lead role for Unplanned, a drama about the life of Abby Johnson, a former Planned Parenthood director who became an anti-abortion activist. After learning about Abby's testimony, Bratcher was deeply moved and quickly accepted the role. Others discouraged her from working with the film out of concern that she would be blacklisted, but Bratcher decided that the role was "worth it". The cast and crew commended her on her commitment to the role, and Abby Johnson complimented Bratcher on accurately portraying her.

Personal life

Family and faith 
On April 23, 2010, Bratcher married her high school sweetheart David Bratcher after seven years of dating. They have one child together, a son. The family resides in Georgia. According to Bratcher, her son was the result of an unintended pregnancy and she and family were forced to rely on WIC and Medicaid in order to get by. She also reported initial feelings of shame associated with her pregnancy but now credits the birth of her son with making her a better person and deepening her devotion to Christianity.

Anti-abortion efforts 
Shortly before the release of Unplanned, Bratcher told the media that after she had started working on the movie, her mother told Bratcher that she became pregnant with Bratcher at 19 years old and had pawned a family heirloom in order to cover the cost of an abortion but ultimately changed her mind, resulting in Bratcher's birth.

Since the release of Unplanned, she has spoken at crisis pregnancy centers nationwide. After the release of Unplanned, Bratcher started the Unplanned Movie Scholarship to offer scholarships to women facing unplanned pregnancies.

She also voiced her support of the Living Infants Fairness Equality (LIFE) Act (Georgia HB481), a legislative effort that would ban abortion after six weeks of pregnancy.

Hobbies 
Bratcher is a competitive practitioner of Brazilian jiu-jitsu, which she sees as an avenue of personal growth.

Filmography

References

External links

1987 births
Living people
21st-century Christians
Actresses from Georgia (U.S. state)
Actresses from North Carolina
American Christians
American anti-abortion activists
American evangelicals
American film actresses
American practitioners of Brazilian jiu-jitsu
American television actresses
Christians from Georgia (U.S. state)
Christians from North Carolina
Campbell University alumni
21st-century American women